Sanjia is a town in the west of the island of Hainan, People's Republic of China. It is under the administration of the county-level city of Dongfang.

References

Populated places in Hainan